Kangerlussuaq Airport  is an airport in Kangerlussuaq, a settlement in the Qeqqata municipality in central-western Greenland. Alongside Narsarsuaq Airport, it is one of only two civilian airports in Greenland large enough to handle large airliners. It is located away from the coast and hence less prone to fog and wind in comparison with other airports in Greenland. Kangerlussuaq Airport is the international hub for Air Greenland. The Kangerlussuaq area has very few inhabitants (around 500), so few passengers have their origin or destination here; most passengers change planes.

History

The first airport was built here during the US occupation in 1941 under the name of Bluie West-8, later renamed Sondrestromfjord Air Base and Sondrestrom Air Base.

In the mid 1950s, transatlantic civilian flights began using the air base for refueling. In 1956,  Scandinavian Airlines (SAS) was flying "Polar route" service with three round trip flights per week being operated with Douglas DC-6B propliners on a routing of Copenhagen - Sondre Stromfjord (now Kangerlussuaq) - Winnipeg - Los Angeles.  This use enabled air travel to Greenland, but fell off in the 1960s as airliners gained greater range. Instead the base became the hub of Greenland air traffic. The airport was handed over to civilian Greenlandic control in 1992.

At a late 2011 Air Greenland meeting, plans to move the main Greenland intercontinental air hub away from Kangerlussuaq were agreed upon. According to the 2011 plan, three  airstrips will be built: a new airport at Qaqortoq, as well as extensions at Nuuk and Ilulissat. New airports will probably also be built at Tasiilaq and Ittoqqortoormiit later. Alongside Kangerlussuaq, the airports at Narsarsuaq and Kulusuk (if Tasiilaq is built) will also be closed. Generally, a number of the airstrips have been built by the US military at locations deliberately away from major settlements, partly due to the Danish policy to downplay the presence of the US military in Greenland. There is also a need to renovate the Kangerlussuaq runway for a fairly high cost as the permafrost is melting under it.

Construction at Nuuk Airport started late 2019. This, in combination with the condition of the runway, will probably mean that Kangerlussuaq will be eventually closed or used for smaller planes for flights to other cities in Greenland only, and for charter flights in connection with cruise ship arrivals.

Even if Nuuk and Ilulissat will get direct flights from Europe, Kangerlussuaq will still be important, partly due more stable weather and longer runway. Cruise ships want to exchange passengers at Greenland because the long journey time to Greenland and back to home is unsuitable for many passengers. They need a reliable airport with few delays, because cruise ships have firm planned schedules with booked ports and land activities. For this reason, in 2018 plans were approved to build a better port near Kangerlussuaq together with a 15 km road to the airport. As of 2018, the small port cannot take cruise ships nor large freight ships, so transfer boats are needed.

Facilities
The terminal is open for 24 hours a day during summer. Hotel Kangerlussuaq, with 70 rooms and a restaurant, is located within the terminal building of the airport, providing accommodation for transferring passengers. Other amenities include a nightclub and a self-service bar open in the daytime. Several tourism outfitters share an office in the terminal, alongside the Tourist Office. There are also more simple accommodations in Kangerlussuaq.

Airlines and destinations

Passenger

Access to several research camps on the Greenland ice sheet, including the Danish field camp North GRIP and the American Summit Camp, is handled through Kangerlussuaq via the 109th Airlift Wing of the New York Air National Guard. There are also a few tourist charter flights between Germany and Kangerlussuaq every summer, in connection with cruise ship arrivals to the Kangerlussuaq seaport. Those flights have typically been operated by Air Greenland or airlines from Germany. Other charter flights are used, for example a number of flights from the US and Canada landed in connection with the 2016 Arctic Winter Games in Nuuk and a flight to Canada in connection with the 2023 Arctic Winter Games.

Cargo
Flights from Copenhagen using large aircraft are the main way of quick transport of mail and goods, including fresh food, to Greenland. Because of the lack of a good port at Kangerlussuaq, most material is transported by air to other destinations. Goods that do not need such quick transport are often freighted by air to Nuuk and then by ship to other places in Greenland. A road to Sisimiut at the coast is planned with this freight in mind. In general, there are worries about cost, and furthermore the uncertainty of the future of Kangerlussuaq airport makes it hard to decide upon a road or a port.

Accidents and Incidents
In 1961, a DHC-3 Otter, operated by Greenlandair, crashed at emergency landing in terrain near Kangerlussuaq, because of a fire on board. One crew member was killed. There were 2 crew and 4 passengers on board.

In 1968, three US T-33 jet trainers collided and crashed into a nearby mountain. All three pilots parachuted to safety.

In 1976, a US Air Force C-141A cargo plane crashed, killing 23 of 27 passengers and crew on board.

See also
 List of airports in Greenland
 List of the busiest airports in the Nordic countries

References

External links

Official website

Airports in Greenland
Airports in the Arctic
Kangerlussuaq